This article contains crystal structure data used in the article crystal structure of boron-rich metal borides.

Table I

Chemical composition can be calculated as Y0.62Al0.71B14.

Table II

Table III

a The number n in the atom designation Bn,n refers to the B12-nth icosahedron to which the Bn,n belongs. Si6.n and B6.n belong to the B12Si3 unit.

b,c,d The Si and B sites are in the same interstice, which is assumed to be fully occupied by both Si and B atoms with occupancies of Occ.(Si) and Occ.(B), respectively, where Occ.(Si)+Occ.(B) = 1. Position of the boron atom was adjusted independently by fixing the thermal parameters at the same value as for the Si atom in the same interstice.

e The temperature factor is fixed at this value.

f Equivalent isotropic temperature factor. It was calculated from the relation Beq. = 4/3(a2β11 + b2β22 + c2β33).

Table IVa
Structure data for homologous compounds.

The sum of those values was fixed at 1.0.

Table IVb

Table IVc

Table Va

The sum of those values was fixed at 1.0.

Table Vb

Table VI

a Obtained by structure analysis.

Table VII

Table VIII

a Anisotropic thermal factors are applied to Sc sites, and Ueq (one-third of the trace of the orthogonalized Uij tensor) is listed in these columns.

Table IX

a Anisotropic thermal factors are applied to Sc sites, and Ueq (one-third of the trace of the orthogonalized Uij tensor) is listed in these columns.

Table X

a Anisotropic thermal factors are applied to Sc sites, and Ueq (one-third of the trace of the orthogonalized Uij tensor) is listed in these columns.

References

Borides
Crystallography